Niyazov or Niazov (f. Niyazova or Niazova) is a Russianized Central Asian (Kazakh, Uzbek, Bukhari Jewish, Tajiki, and Turkmen) family name. The meanings of the surname are in Persian or Bukhari. "Niyaz"/Niaz means: 1. Gift, 2. Wish, 3. compassion.
The suffix "ov" means 's (Niaz's). 

Niyazov may refer to:
 Atamyrat Nyýazow (1912–1942), Soviet Red Army soldier, father of Saparmyrat
 Abdul-Vahed Niyazov (b. 1969), Russian businessman
 Edige Niyazov (1940–2009), Kazakhstani artist
 Marat Nyýazow (1933–2009), Soviet and Turkmen sport shooter
 Muza Niýazowa (b. 1938), wife of Saparmyrat 
 Murat Nyýazow (b. 1967), Turkmen politician, son of Saparmyrat and Muza
 Saparmyrat Nyýazow (1940–2006), Turkmen politician
 Tahmina Niyazova (b. 1989), a Tajiki female singer

References 

Kazakh-language surnames
Uzbek-language surnames
Tajik-language surnames
Jewish surnames
Turkmen-language surnames